The International School of Western Australia (ISWA) is a co-educational, non-denominational, independent international school in Doubleview, Western Australia. They offer education services to both local and international students from Kindergarten to Year 12.

Learning at ISWA follows the Western Australian curriculum through the globally recognised International Baccalaureate programmes.  They  offers two academic pathways for senior students in Years 11 and 12: the International Baccalaureate Diploma Programme and the US College Board Advanced Placement.  Both are an alternative to the Western Australian Certificate of Education programme and are recognised for entrance into Western Australian universities, as well as universities around the globe.

French and Spanish are the two languages other than English that are taught from Years K-12. The ICT Integration Programme reflects 21st century pedagogy with a 1:1 notebook programme from Years 4-12 and access to devices from Years K-3.

There is a focus on STEM subjects in the curricular and co-curricular programmes. The academic calendar is largely based on the northern hemisphere calendar. ISWA is a co-educational and non-denominational school for local and international students.

References

External links

 International School of Western Australia

Private primary schools in Perth, Western Australia
Private secondary schools in Perth, Western Australia
International Baccalaureate schools in Australia